Michael Tonello (born July 19, ?) is an author best known for being an expert on Birkin bags, a luxury lady's handbag.

Tonello was a reseller of luxury goods, finding his niche buying Hermès items at retail and reselling them on eBay. 
 
In 2008 William Morrow/HarperCollins published his memoir called Bringing Home the Birkin; My Life in Hot Pursuit of the World’s Most Coveted Handbag. The book details his adventures as an eBay entrepreneur who travels all over the world, going to Hermès stores to procure "same day" Birkins for wealthy and famous clients who do not want to wait for the item. The book, now published in Italian, Korean, Chinese, Thai, Mandarin, Japanese, Portuguese, Polish, and Turkish, reached #3 on the Boston Globe Bestseller List (Non-Fiction).
 
In 2016 Tonello co-founded the luxury brand Respoke.

References 

Living people
Barnstable High School alumni
People from Barnstable, Massachusetts
HuffPost writers and columnists
American male non-fiction writers
20th-century American journalists
American male journalists
Year of birth missing (living people)
EBay